Neuralized-like protein 1 is a protein that in humans is encoded by the NEURL gene.

See also
 NEURL2 (gene)

References

Further reading

Human proteins